Albert L. Farr (late 19th century - 1947) was an American residential architect who designed homes in the Craftsman and Georgian styles.

Biography
Born in Omaha, Nebraska, he grew up in Yokohama, Japan. The Farr family returned to the United States in 1891, and settled in the San Francisco Bay Area.  Farr lived at various times in San Francisco (at 2528 Union), and also in Berkeley, Piedmont, and Oakland.  From 1909 through the end of his career he maintained an office at 68 Post Street in San Francisco.

Farr earned his architecture license in 1901, one of the first in California.  He took on a partner in 1922, eventually naming his firm Farr & Ward.  Farr and his firm designed buildings throughout the Bay Area, particularly in the San Francisco neighborhoods of Russian Hill, Pacific Heights, Sea Cliff, and St. Francis Wood.  Many of his designs involve a facade of brown wooden shingles.

Projects

40 Crocker (1906)
2714 Broadway (1900)
2714 Divisadero (1900)
2660 Scott (1901)
2858 Vallejo (1901)
2419 Vallejo (1902)
2175-81 Pacific (1902)
3333 Pacific (1902)
3343 Pacific (1902)
2801 Broadway (1902)
2737 Vallejo (1902)
2310 Steiner (1903, remodel)
2881 Vallejo (1904)
2891 Vallejo (1904)
2400 Vallejo (1905)
2004 10th Ave (1906, Oakland)
2950 Pacific (1907)
653 Lake (1911)
2659-61 Green (1911)
2649 Green (1916)
66 Hillcrest (1921, Berkeley CA)
2570 Jackson (1923, currently French Consul-General's house)
2310 Broadway (1927)
3699 Washington (1929)
3 Sky Castle (1929, Pleasanton, CA)
Sundial Lodge, (1929) Carmel-by-the-Sea, California
2520 Pacific (1930, rebuild)
2574 Broadway (1932)
60 McLaren Avenue (1934)
2699 Filbert (1936, remodel)
2130 Vallejo (1936, remodel)
635 D Street (1937, Petaluma)
455 Sea Cliff Avenue (1938)
2550 Pierce (1941)

Farr also designed houses in Belvedere, Piedmont and Woodside.  His most famous is the Wolf House for Jack London, in Glen Ellen. The  home burned before construction was completed.  Long thought to be the result of an arson, recent analysis of the ruins, located in Jack London State Historic Park, determined the cause to be spontaneous combustion.

External links
Albert Farr architect profile
Wolf House
SF Architectural Heritage "The San Francisco Architecture of Albert Farr, Part II"

References

History of the San Francisco Bay Area
Artists from Omaha, Nebraska
Architects from San Francisco
1947 deaths
American residential architects
Year of birth missing